The 2021 Elmbridge Borough Council election was held on 6 May 2021 to elect members of Elmbridge Borough Council in England. This was on the same day as other local elections. The elections were postponed from May 2020 due to the COVID-19 pandemic.

Results summary

40.661

Results by Ward

Claygate

Cobham & Downside

Esher

Hersham Village

Hinchley Wood & Weston Green

Long Ditton

Molesey East

Molesey West

Oatlands & Burwood Park

Oxshott & Stoke D'Abernon

Thames Ditton

Walton Central

Walton North

Walton South

Weybridge Riverside

Weybridge St. George's Hill

By-elections

References

Elmbridge Borough Council elections
Elmbridge